Bruce Mitchel Kogut (born 1953) is an American organizational theorist, and Professor of Leadership and Ethics Director of the Columbia Business School. He is particularly known for his work with Udo Zander on knowledge-based theory of the firm.

Biography 
Kogut obtained his BA in Political Science in 1975 at the University of California, his MA in International Affairs in 1978 at the Columbia University, New York and in 1983 his PhD at the MIT Sloan School of Management.

After graduation in 1983 Kogut started his academic career at the Wharton School of the University of Pennsylvania as Assistant Professor at the Department of Management, where he got promoted Associate Professor and eventually Chaired Professor. From 1993 to 1995 he was also Director of Wharton's Emerging Economies Programs, and from 1997 to 2000 Associate Dean for its Doctoral Programs. From 1994 to 2002 he also co-directed the Reginald H. Jones Center for Management Policy, Strategy, and Organization. In 2003 he moved to INSEAD, where he was appointed the Eli Lilly Chair in Innovation, Business and Society. From 2004 to 2006 he was also Scientific Director at the EIASM in Brussels, and from 2005 to 2007 founding Director of Insead Social Entrepreneurship Program. Since 2007 back in the United States he is Sanford Bernstein Chaired Professor at the Columbia Business School.

Kogut's research interests are in the field of "comparative and economic sociology, strategy, comparative methods, social entrepreneurship, and governance."

Kogut teaches courses to PhD, EMBA and MBA programs.

Selected publications 
 Bowman, Edward H., and Bruce Mitchel Kogut, eds. Redesigning the firm. New York: Oxford University Press, 1995.

Articles, a selection:
 Kogut, Bruce. "Joint ventures: Theoretical and empirical perspectives." Strategic management journal 9.4 (1988): 319-332.
 Kogut, Bruce, and Udo Zander. "Knowledge of the firm, combinative capabilities, and the replication of technology." Organization science 3.3 (1992): 383-397.
 Kogut, Bruce, and Harbir Singh. "The effect of national culture on the choice of entry mode." Journal of international business studies (1988): 411-432.
 Kogut, Bruce, and Udo Zander. "Knowledge of the firm and the evolutionary theory of the multinational corporation." Journal of international business studies (1993): 625-645.
 Zander, Udo, and Bruce Kogut. "Knowledge and the speed of the transfer and imitation of organizational capabilities: An empirical test." Organization science 6.1 (1995): 76-92.
 Kogut, Bruce, and Udo Zander. "What firms do? Coordination, identity, and learning." Organization science 7.5 (1996): 502-518.
 Almeida, Paul, and Bruce Kogut. "Localization of knowledge and the mobility of engineers in regional networks." Management science 45.7 (1999): 905-917.

References

External links 
 Bruce Kogut at Columbia Business School

1953 births
Living people
American business theorists
University of California alumni
School of International and Public Affairs, Columbia University alumni
MIT Sloan School of Management alumni
Wharton School of the University of Pennsylvania faculty
Academic staff of INSEAD
Columbia Business School faculty
Place of birth missing (living people)
Date of birth missing (living people)